is a Japanese footballer who plays for Tokyo Verdy.

Club statistics
Updated to 19 July 2022.

1Includes J1 Playoffs and J2/J3 Playoffs.

References

External links

Profile at Tokyo Verdy

1990 births
Living people
Hosei University alumni
People from Higashikurume, Tokyo
Association football people from Tokyo Metropolis
Japanese footballers
J2 League players
J3 League players
Japan Football League players
FC Machida Zelvia players
Tokyo Verdy players
Association football defenders